Moyencourt is a commune in the Somme department in Hauts-de-France in northern France.

Geography
Not to be confused with a commune of a similar name, Moyencourt-lès-Poix, further to the west of the département.

Population

See also
Communes of the Somme department

References

External links

 Moyencourt on the Quid website 

Communes of Somme (department)